Governor Grant may refer to:

Alexander Grant (British Army officer) (1775–1827), Acting Governor of Sierra Leone in 1820 and 1821
Henry Grant (British Army officer) (1848–1919), Governor of Malta from 1907 to 1909
James Grant (British Army officer, born 1720) (1720–1806), Governor of East Florida from 1763 to 1771
John Peter Grant (1807–1893), Governor of Jamaica from 1866 to 1874
Lewis Grant (colonial administrator) (1777–1852), Governor of the Bahamas from 1821 to 1829 and Governor of Trinidad from 1829 to 1833
Patrick Grant (Indian Army officer) (1804–1895), Governor of Malta from 1867 to 1872
Robert Grant (MP) (1779–1838), Governor of Bombay from 1835 to 1838